The 2008 London Marathon was the 28th running of the annual marathon race in London, England, which took place on Sunday, 13 April. The elite men's race was won by Kenya's Martin Lel in a time of 2:05:15 hours and the women's race was won by Germany's Irina Mikitenko in 2:24:14.

In the wheelchair races, Britain's David Weir (1:33:56) and Switzerland's Sandra Graf (1:48:04) won the men's and women's divisions, respectively. Graf knocked over a minute off the course record.

Around 120,000 people applied to enter the race: 48,630 had their applications accepted and 35,037 started the race. A total of 34,212 runners, 23,574 men and 10,638 women, finished the race.

Results

Men

Women

Wheelchair men

Wheelchair women

References

Results
Men's results. Association of Road Racing Statisticians. Retrieved 2020-04-12.
Women's results. Association of Road Racing Statisticians. Retrieved 2020-04-12.

External links

Official website

2008
London Marathon
Marathon
London Marathon